Austrognathiidae is a family of worms belonging to the order Bursovaginoidea.

Genera:
 Austrognatharia Sterrer, 1971
 Austrognathia Sterrer, 1965
 Triplignathia Sterrer, 1991

References

Gnathostomulida
Platyzoa families